The 1982–83 Calgary Flames season was the third season in Calgary and 11th for the Flames franchise in the National Hockey League.  Despite finishing the season below .500, the Flames had their best ever finish in the division standings, placing second in the Smythe Division.  In the playoffs, Calgary was able to avenge the previous season's defeat at the hands of the Vancouver Canucks by knocking off Vancouver in four games.  In the second round, the Flames met up with their provincial rivals, the Edmonton Oilers, for the first time.  The series would not be close, as Edmonton powered past Calgary in five games, including humiliating 10–2 and 9–1 victories over the Flames.

"Badger" Bob Johnson replaced Al MacNeil as the team's head coach prior to the season.  Johnson would go on to coach 400 games with the Flames, and win 193 games in five seasons, both of which remain Flames records.  Johnson would later gain election into the Hockey Hall of Fame in 1992.

Lanny McDonald, in his first full season in Calgary, had a career year, battling Wayne Gretzky for the scoring lead all season long.  McDonald finished the season five goals behind Gretzky, but his mark of 66 remains a Flames record.  McDonald was the Flames representative at the 1983 All-Star Game, and was awarded the Bill Masterton Trophy for perseverance, sportsmanship, and dedication to the game.

Regular season

Season standings

Schedule and results

Playoffs

Player statistics

Skaters
Note: GP = Games played; G = Goals; A = Assists; Pts = Points; PIM = Penalty minutes

†Denotes player spent time with another team before joining Calgary.  Stats reflect time with the Flames only.
‡Traded mid-season.
Bold denotes franchise record.

Goaltenders
Note: GP = Games played; TOI = Time on ice (minutes); W = Wins; L = Losses; OT = Overtime/shootout losses; GA = Goals against; SO = Shutouts; GAA = Goals against average

Transactions
The Flames were involved in the following transactions during the 1982–83 season.

Trades

Free agents

Draft picks

Calgary's picks at the 1982 NHL Entry Draft, held in Montreal, Quebec.

See also
1982–83 NHL season

References

Player stats: 2007–08 Calgary Flames Media Guide, p. 129.
Game log: 2007–08 Calgary Flames Media Guide, p. 141.
Team standings:  1982–83 NHL standings @hockeydb.com
Trades: Individual player pages at hockeydb.com

Calgary Flames seasons
Calgary Flames season, 1982-83
Calg
Calgary Flames
Calgary Flames